"Hearken Unto Me, Ye Holy Children" is an anthem composed by Maurice Greene in 1728. The first performance was probably given on 1 March 1728 at the King's College Chapel, Cambridge; however there is some conjecture that the actual first performance date was 25 April 1728 (to coincide with King George II's visit).

A typical performance takes about 17 minutes.

Voices
 Countertenor
 Tenor
 Bass
 Chorus

Movements 
The work has the following movements:

Anthems
Choral compositions
17th-century songs